This is a partial list of British Landing Grounds (LG) In North Africa, used during World War II. There are over 250 known. Some coordinates may be incorrect.  Not all of these were active airfields; some were depots, some were repair stations, and some were decoys. Some are still in use, and some were moved and upgraded by Americans to handle heavy bombers. (It should also be noted that LG-176 through LG-186 were also numbered LG 1 through 10).

LGs

Misc.
Evidently assigned by other commands:
 Bir Terfawi 
 8 Bells  
 LG 416  Deir ez-Zor Airport
 LG 426  Tadmur Airport
 LG 500  ?
 LG 598  Kufra west
 Big Carin

Palestine Mandate

 Muqeible Airfield 
 RAF St Jean 
 RAF Aqir   now Tel Nof Israeli Air Force Base 
 RAF Ein Shemer  now Ein Shemer Airfield 
 RAF Gaza  ?? 
 Herzliya Airport 
 RAF Haifa  now Haifa Airport 
 RAF Lydda  now Ben Gurion International Airport 
 RAF Petah Tiqva  now Kfar Sirkin Airfield 
 RAF Qastina  Now Hatzor Israeli Air Force Base 
 RAF Ramat David  now Ramat David Israeli Air Force Base 
 RAF Ramleh 
 RAF Netanya Also known as Kfar Hayim??
 Sde Dov Airport 
 RAF Beit Daras ,
 RAF El Bassa ?? , Betzet
 RAF Machanaim , Ben Ya'akov Airport
 RAF Magiddo ,  Megiddo Airport
 RAF Amman ,  
 RAF Mafraq ,
 RAF Zerqa , now Dawson's Field

See also

 Desert Air Force
 Advanced Landing Ground
 List of former Royal Air Force stations
 List of Royal Air Force aircraft squadrons
 Western Desert Campaign
 Operation Crusader
 First Battle of El Alamein
 Frontier Wire (Libya)
 Long Range Desert Group
 Tragedy at Kufra

References

 RAF Squadrons by C.G. Jefford  page 133
 http://www.lib.utexas.edu/maps/ams/north_africa/

External links
 http://www.laetusinpraesens.org/guests/jwbj/jwb1.htm
 http://www.211squadron.org/
 Libya-http://www.wwii-photos-maps.com/targetnorthafrica/Libya/index.html
 Egypt-http://www.wwii-photos-maps.com/targetnorthafrica/Egypt/index.html
 http://www.suezveteransassociation.org.uk/cz-map.html
 http://113squadron.com/id35.htm

 
 
 
For
Airports in Western Sahara
Airports in Morocco